The 2010 United States House of Representatives special election for Indiana's Third congressional district occurred on November 2, 2010 to elect the successor to Mark Souder (R) who resigned upon admitting to an extramarital affair. This election coincided with the regularly scheduled election.

Background
Two weeks after winning renomination, Souder resigned both from office as U.S. Representative and as the Republican nominee for the Third district following the revelation of an affair with Tracy Meadows Jackson, a married female staffer. Governor Mitch Daniels (R), in the interest of cutting the costs of holding the election, scheduled the special election to succeed him to occur on the same day as the general election.

Nominating caucuses
As per Indiana state law, the parties held caucuses within thirty days following Souder's resignation to choose their nominees for the special election.

Republican
Republicans held their caucus on June 12. State Senator Marlin Stutzman, the runner-up in the Republican U.S. Senatorial primary, won the nomination decisively in the second round over state Representative Randy Borror, car salesman Bob Thomas, Fort Wayne City Councilwoman Liz Brown, and Ryan Elijah.

Democratic
Democrats choose former Fort Wayne city councilman Tom Hayhurst, who had won the Democratic primary for the general election earlier, as their nominee for the special election.

Libertarian
Tea Party activist and ex-Republican Scott W. Wise, also their nominee for the general election, was chosen as the Libertarian nominee for the special election.

Polling

Election results
Given the district's strong conservative bent, which at the time had a Cook Partisan Voting Index of R+14, Stutzman, as predicted by many political prognosticators, handily won the simultaneous special and general elections in November.

Special election

General election

References

Indiana 2010 03
Indiana 2010 03
2010 03 Special
Indiana 03 Special
United States House of Representatives 03 Special
United States House of Representatives 2010 03